The Church of the Assumption of Our Lady is a Roman Catholic parish church in Torquay, Devon, England. It was built from 1853 to 1854 and designed by Joseph Hansom in the Gothic revival style. It is located on the junction of Abbey Road and Warren Road in the centre of the town. It is a Grade II listed building.

History

Construction
Robert Shedden Sulyarde Cary of the Cary family at Torre Abbey gave the land on which the church was built. On 24 April 1853, the foundation stone was laid by the Bishop of Plymouth George Errington. The church was designed by Joseph Hansom who also designed Plymouth Cathedral and Our Lady Help of Christians and St Denis Church in St Marychurch, Torquay. On 17 February 1854, the church was opened and consecrated.

Developments
In 1857, the presbytery and school were built. Both were designed by Joseph Hansom. In 1858, the south aisle and chapel were built. In the 1860s the stained glass windows were installed in the church, they were made by Hardman & Co. In 1981, the interior was reordered and redecorated.

Parish
The church is in the parish of the Assumption of Our Lady, which also includes Holy Angels Church in Torquay. The Church of the Assumption of Our Lady has two Sunday Masses at 6:00pm on Saturday and at 10:30am on Sunday. Holy Angels Church has a Sunday Mass at 8:30am.

See also
 Diocese of Plymouth

References

External links
 

Buildings and structures in Torquay
Roman Catholic churches in Devon
Grade II listed churches in Devon
Grade II listed Roman Catholic churches in England
Gothic Revival church buildings in England
Gothic Revival architecture in Devon
Buildings by Joseph Hansom
1853 establishments in England
Roman Catholic churches completed in 1854
Religious organizations established in 1853
19th-century Roman Catholic church buildings in the United Kingdom